Robert Joseph Roberts (born 15 October 1979) is a British Independent politician. He has been the Member of Parliament (MP) for Delyn in North Wales since the 2019 general election. He was elected as a member of the Conservative Party.

In 2020, Roberts reportedly sent sexually suggestive text messages to a female staff member which resulted in his being referred to the British House of Commons' Complaints and Standards Committee. Roberts was also investigated by the Conservative Party; in April 2021, Roberts was "strongly rebuked" by the Conservative Party for his conduct. In May 2021, an independent panel found that Roberts had acted inappropriately after he sought to engage in a relationship with a male member of his staff; he subsequently lost the Conservative  party whip in October of the same year.

Early life and education
Roberts grew up in Northop Hall, a large village near the town of Mold, Flintshire. He attended Ysgol Maes Garmon school in Mold and is a fluent Welsh speaker. Prior to being elected to Parliament, Roberts was a financial planner, working in the industry since 2003.

Parliamentary career
Roberts defeated the incumbent Labour MP David Hanson at the 2019 general election. Since 2 March 2020, Roberts has been a member of the Welsh Affairs Select Committee and the Procedure Committee.

Sexual misconduct allegations
On 21 July 2020, BBC Wales published text messages attributed to Roberts and sent to a female junior member of parliamentary staff in April 2020. The text messages to the staff member suggested that she "fool around with no strings". Roberts told her he "might be gay but I enjoy … fun times". The text messages continued after the intern reported struggling with her mental health. Roberts apologised for his behaviour.

Roberts was referred to Parliament's Complaints and Standards Committee in June over allegations of misconduct that resulted in one of the interns being transferred to a different department. In April 2021 the Conservative Party announced that Roberts had been "strongly rebuked", but would not lose the whip. Roberts was instructed to undertake safeguarding and social media protection training. 

Roberts separately apologised after seeking to engage in an improper relationship with a member of his staff. Roberts reportedly asked a male parliamentary member of staff out to dinner, which the man said had made him feel uncomfortable. On 25 May 2021 an independent panel recommended that Roberts should be suspended from parliament for six weeks after it found he breached Parliament's sexual misconduct policy. He subsequently lost the Conservative whip and had his membership of the Conservative Party suspended.  His six-week parliamentary suspension was confirmed on 27 May, and subsequently Jacob Rees-Mogg and Keir Starmer both called for his resignation. Not long afterwards, the Communities Secretary, Robert Jenrick, called for Roberts to resign his seat.

After his parliamentary suspension expired, Roberts returned to the Commons in July 2021, amid criticism from both Labour and Conservative sources. He was readmitted to the Conservative Party as a member in October 2021, but still sits as an independent.

Personal life
Roberts announced via a number of Tweets in May 2020 that he is gay. According to The Independent, he has separated from his wife Alexandra.

Electoral history

Of the 105 rejected ballots:
87 were either unmarked or it was uncertain who the vote was for.
18 voted for more than one candidate.

References

External links

1979 births
Living people
Conservative Party (UK) MPs for Welsh constituencies
Gay politicians
LGBT members of the Parliament of the United Kingdom
Welsh LGBT politicians
People from Northop
UK MPs 2019–present
Welsh-speaking politicians
Politicians affected by a party expulsion process
Independent members of the House of Commons of the United Kingdom